David Ramsay Hay  (March 1798, Edinburgh – 10 September 1866) was a Scottish artist, interior decorator and colour theorist.

Life

David Ramsay Hay was the son of Rebekah or Rebecca Carmichael, a published poet and friend of Robert Burns. They lived at the foot of Monteith's Close off the Royal Mile in Edinburgh. After her husband died prematurely and penniless, David was educated at the expense of her brother, David Ramsay, a banker and owner of the Edinburgh Evening Courant, then apprenticed as a reading-boy in Ramsay's printing office in Edinburgh. Instead though (around 1813), Hay moved to join Gavin Beugo (son of John Beugo) a decorative artist, based on West Register Street in Edinburgh's New Town. His fellow-apprentice was his friend, the topographical artist David Roberts. In April 1820 he commenced work at Abbotsford for Walter Scott. In 1850 he decorated Holyroodhouse for Queen Victoria. In the 1920s, Queen Mary had these decorative schemes painted over, but watercolours commissioned by Victoria in 1863 give some idea of their appearance.

Hay was an advocate of imitative finishes such as graining and marbling, and textured paints to imitate brocade fabrics. From 1828, he developed his theory of colour harmony over six successive editions of his book, The Laws of Harmonious Colouring Adapted to Interior Decorations. Hay wrote about his experience decorating Abbotsford for Walter Scott in the sixth edition of his Harmonious Colouring.

In his final years he had exclusive premises at 90 George Street in the centre of Edinburgh's New Town.

He died in Edinburgh on 10 September 1866. He is buried in Warriston Cemetery in the north of the city. The substantial tombstone stands to the south-west of the sealed eastern entrance. The monument is vandalised and the original bronze bas-relief sculpture of his profile has been stolen.

Publications
see
The Laws of Harmonious Colouring in House Painting (1828)
The Natural Principles and Analogy of the Harmony of Form (1842)
Proportion: or the Geometric Principle of Beauty Analysed (1843)
First Principles of Symmetrical Beauty (1846)
The Science of Beauty (1856)
"A Nomenclature of Colours" (1845)

References

External links
 National Portrait Gallery page with biography of Hay
 Rebekah Carmichael at the Eighteenth-Century Poetry Archive (ECPA)
 Carmichael, Rebekah, Poems by Miss Carmichael, Edinburgh (1790) (list of subscribers names of interest)
 Hay, David Ramsay, The Laws of Harmonious Colouring Adapted to Interior Decorations, 3rd edition (1836) 
 The Laws of Harmonious Colouring Adapted to Interior Decorations, 6th edition (1847)
 Hay, David Ramsay, Proportion or, The Laws of Beauty Analysed, Blackwood (1843)
 Hay, David Ramsay, The Principles of Beauty in Colouring Systematized, Blackwood (1845)
 Hay, David Ramsay, First Principles of Symmetrical Beauty, Blackwood (1846)
 Hay, David Ramsay, The Natural Principle of Beauty, as developed in the Human Figure, Blackwood (1852)
 Hay, David Ramsay, The Harmonic Law of Nature Applied to Architectural Design, Blackwood (1855)
 Hay, David Ramsay, The Science of Beauty: as developed in Applied Art and Nature, Blackwood (1856)

Scottish interior designers
1798 births
1866 deaths
Artists from Edinburgh
19th-century Scottish writers
19th-century Scottish painters
Scottish male painters
Fellows of the Royal Society of Edinburgh
Scottish non-fiction writers
Scottish art critics
Color scientists
Scottish watercolourists
Scottish businesspeople
19th-century British businesspeople
19th-century Scottish male artists